ZFK Zenit Saint Petersburg is the women's team of Russian football club FC Zenit Saint Petersburg. The club participates in the Russian Women's Football Championship, the top division of Russian women football.

History
The original Zenit's women team has been founded on 21 January 2020, by support of Gazprom as women's department of FC Zenit, to take part in the Russian championship starting from 2020 season.

League and cup history

Players

Current squad
.

Former players

Notable players 

Russia
  Yulia Grichenko
  Ekaterina Morozova
  Yulia Zapotichnaya
  Ekaterina Sochneva

Club officials

Management

Presidents

Head coaches

Kit suppliers

See also
WFC Rossiyanka
ZFK CSKA Moscow

References

External links

Zenit Saint Petersburg
Women's football clubs in Russia
Association football clubs established in 2020
2020 establishments in Russia